B2X GmbH is a customer service outsourcing company based in Munich, Germany. It was founded in 2007, by Karim Barkawi for manufacturers of smartphones and other electronic devices, insurance providers, mobile network operators and retailers. The services are based on a technology platform called SMARTCARE Technology. The company works in more than 130 countries through a network of over 400 service partners and 2,000 service locations.

History
The company was founded in 2007 by management consultant Karim Barkawi. In 2008, B2X took on the warranties held by Siemens Mobile after the company decided to discontinue its mobile phone operations. B2X's core business is provision of customer service results in the business process outsourcing (BPO) arena. This also includes customer care and after-sales solutions primarily to global smartphone and IoT brands. For example, Microsoft outsourced support for Nokia and Microsoft mobile devices to B2X in 2016.

Shortly after its launch, B2X received initial investment from Grazia Equity in 2009. In 2010, B2X announced the closing of a financing round with Earlybird. The financing was said to be used to further drive international growth and to expand the service scope to a broader range of end-product markets.

In January 2014, it was announced that it has been named as one of the final 100 businesses and Ruban d'Honneur recipients in the 2013/2014 European Business Awards. Selected as one of ten finalists in the InfoSys Business of the Year Award for companies with more than EUR 150m in revenue B2X was awarded Winner of the European business awards in May 2014. Furthermore, Gartner selected B2X as a Cool Vendor for Supply Chain Management in 2014.

In 2016, B2X ranked on the third position of the Inc. 5000 Europe list. As of 2017, B2X had over 1,000 employees across 35 countries.

B2X’ headquarters is located in Munich, Germany. As of 2017, the company has a presence in Argentina, Australia, Belarus, Brazil, Canada, Chile, China, Colombia, Denmark, France, Greece, Hong Kong, Indonesia, Italy, Japan, Mexico, Peru, Poland, Portugal, Russia, Singapore, Slovakia, South Africa, South Korea, Spain, Sweden, Thailand, United Arab Emirates, United Kingdom, United States, Venezuela, Vietnam. The company additionally maintains a strong presence in India.

B2X’s service range comprises backend and frontend solutions and begins with the term SMART, followed by a description of the service application. Their backend results include SMARTLOGISTICS, SMARTREPAIR, SMARTPARTS and SMARTRECOVERY. B2X’s frontend results include SMARTAPP, SMARTWEB, SMARTHELP and SMARTBAR.

Since April 2016, B2X is led by Rainer Koppitz as Chief Executive Officer who was previously CEO at Nfon, a provider of Cloud-based telephone systems. Chairman of the Advisory Board of B2X is Lothar Pauly who was previously CEO of T-Systems, a German global IT services and consulting company and a subsidiary of Deutsche Telekom.

Recognition

 Third position, Inc. 5000 Europe (2016)

References

German companies established in 2007